is a Japanese former footballer who played as a defender.

Playing career
Sasahara was born in Kagoshima Prefecture on November 22, 1996. After graduating from high school, he joined J1 League club Sagan Tosu in 2015. However he could not play at all in the match and left the club end of 2015 season. In 2016, he enrolled in Tokai University. In 2018, he signed for Albirex Niigata (S) after graduating from Tokai University. 

Sasahara scored his 1st goal for the White Swan in the match against Geylang International on 24 June 2018.  

After leaving Albirex, Sasahara transferred to Bruneian club DPMM FC, playing with their second team in the Brunei Super League. He became the  second Japanese player to play in Brunei's top flight since Dan Ito in 2008. He scored on his debut via a direct free-kick against Panchor Murai FC on 28 February 2020. He left the club in October after the league was cancelled.

On 4 May 2021, Sasahara announced his retirement from professional football, and is currently employed at a company in his native Kagoshima Prefecture.

Club statistics
As of 9 March 2020

References

External links

1995 births
Living people
Tokai University alumni
Association football people from Kagoshima Prefecture
Japanese footballers
Japanese expatriate footballers
J1 League players
Sagan Tosu players
Singapore Premier League players
Albirex Niigata Singapore FC players
DPMM FC players
Expatriate footballers in Brunei
Association football defenders